The Roman Catholic Diocese of San Juan de los Lagos (erected 25 March 1972) is a suffragan diocese of the Archdiocese of Guadalajara.
It encompasses the some of the surrounding cities in the Mexican state of Jalisco, including Lagos de Moreno, Tepatitlán and Arandas.

Bishops

Ordinaries
Francisco Javier Nuño y Guerrero (1972 - 1980); Archbishop (personal title)
José López Lara (1981 - 1987) 
José Trinidad Sepúlveda Ruiz-Velasco (1988 - 1999)
Javier Navarro Rodríguez (1999 - 2007), appointed Bishop of Zamora, Michoacán
Felipe Salazar Villagrana (2008 - 2016)
Jorge Alberto Cavazos Arizpe (2016 - 2022), appointed Archbishop of San Luis Potosí

Other priests of this diocese who became bishops
José María de la Torre Martín, appointed Auxiliary Bishop of Guadalajara, Jalisco in 2002
Juan Navarro Castellanos, appointed Auxiliary Bishop of Acapulco, Guerrero in 2004
Raúl Gómez González, appointed Bishop of Tenancingo, México in 2009
Pedro Vázquez Villalobos, appointed Bishop of Puerto Escondido, Oaxaca in 2012
Gerardo Díaz Vázquez, appointed Bishop of Tacámbaro, Michoacán in 2014
Cristóbal Ascencio García, appointed Bishop of Apatzingán, Michoacán in 2014

External links and references

San Juan de los Lagos
San Juan de los Lagos, Roman Catholic Diocese of
San Juan De Los Lagos
San Juan De Los Lagos
San Juan de los Lagos